Nano-Nucleonic Cyborg Summoning is the second EP album by Behold... the Arctopus, released in 2005 on Epicene Sound Systems and limited to 800 copies. It was later released on 12" screen-printed white vinyl limited to 500 copies.

Black Market Activities reissued this EP on August 22, 2006. It contains all of Nano-Nucleonic Cyborg Summoning and Arctopocalypse Now... Warmageddon Later, plus selected live tracks.  The cover art was illustrated by Terry Grow.

Track listing
 "Exospacial Psionic Aura" – 7:38
 "Estrogen/Pathogen Exchange Program" – 5:19
 "Sensory Amusia" – 4:34

Re-release
 "Exospacial Psionic Aura" – 7:31
 "Estrogen/Pathogen Exchange Program" – 5:26
 "Sensory Amusia" – 4:39
 "Alcoholocaust" – 2:50
 "You Will Be Reincarnated as an Imperial Attack Spaceturtle" – 8:27
 "Alcoholocaust" (live) – 3:01
 "You Will Be Reincarnated as an Imperial Attack Spaceturtle" (live) – 8:38
 "Exospacial Psionic Aura" (live) – 7:16
 "Sensory Amusia" (live) – 5:14

Personnel
 Colin Marston – warr guitar
 Mike Lerner – electric guitar
 Charlie Zeleny – drums

References

Behold... The Arctopus albums
2005 EPs
Albums produced by Colin Marston